TJP may refer to:

 Tehrik-e-Jafaria Pakistan, the largest Pakistani Shia organization formerly headed by Arif Hussain Hussaini.
 Tiled JPEG File, a filename extension format developed by the Berkeley Digital Library Project which stores several pictures in a single file.
 T. J. Perkins, professional wrestler
 Tight junction protein (disambiguation)
 Tokyo Joshi Pro Wrestling, a Japanese professional wrestling promotion.